Reaction may refer to a process or to a response to an action, event, or exposure:

Physics and chemistry
Chemical reaction
Nuclear reaction
Reaction (physics), as defined by Newton's third law
Chain reaction (disambiguation).

Biology and medicine

Adverse drug reaction
Allergic reaction
Reflex, neural reaction
Hypersensitivity, immune reaction
Intolerance (disambiguation)
Light reaction (disambiguation).

Psychology

Emotional, reaction
Reactivity (behaviour)
Proactivity, opposite of reactive behaviour
Reactive attachment disorder.

Politics and culture

Reactionary, a political tendency
Reaction video
Commentary (disambiguation).

Proper names and titles
Reaction (album), a 1986 album by American R&B singer Rebbie Jackson
"Reaction" (song), the title song from the Rebbie Jackson album
"Reaction", a single by Dead Letter Circus
ReAction GUI, a GUI toolkit used on AmigaOS
Reaction.life, a political news and commentary website edited by Iain Martin
Reaction Records, a record label
TNA Reaction, a former documentary show of TNA Wrestling (now known as Impact Wrestling) behind the scenes
Reaction (The Spectacular Spider-Man), an episode of the American animated television series The Spectacular Spider-Man
The Reaction, a novel in the Animorphs series
Reactions (journal), a chemistry journal published by MDPI

See also
Action (disambiguation)
Stimulus (disambiguation)